Nudaria idalis is a moth of the subfamily Arctiinae. It is found in the Philippines (Luzon).

References

Nudariina